Cally House may refer to:
Cally Palace, formerly Cally House, Category A listed building in Dumfries and Galloway, Scotland
Cally House, Category C listed building at Cally Bridge, Perth and Kinross, Scotland